"Love School" is a song by Australian rock duo Divinyls, released in March 1991 from their fourth and most successful self titled album. Despite the success of the album and its lead single; the number one hit "I Touch Myself", "Love School" only proved to be a minor success in Australia, peaking at number forty-three on the ARIA top fifty singles chart.

Background

In late 1990, Divinyls released the song "I Touch Myself", which went to number one in Australia, number four in the US and number ten in the UK. It became the most successful single of their career and is regarded as their signature song.

Although "Love School" did not chart internationally, it still became a minor success in Australia where it peaked at number forty-three and spent four weeks in the top fifty.

Track listing
Australian 7"/CD single
 "Love School" (Edit) - 4:10
 "Love School" (Instrumental)

Charts

References

1991 singles
Divinyls songs
Songs written by Chrissy Amphlett
Songs written by Mark McEntee
1990 songs
Virgin Records singles